Juri Ito (born 2 October 2002) is a Japanese professional footballer who plays as a defender for WE League club Nojima Stella Kanagawa Sagamihara.

Club career 
Ito made her WE League debut on 12 September 2021.

References 

Japanese women's footballers
Living people
2002 births
Women's association football defenders
Association football people from Mie Prefecture
Nojima Stella Kanagawa Sagamihara players
WE League players